The 2014–15 Baylor Bears basketball team represented Baylor University in the 2014–15 NCAA Division I men's basketball season. This was head coach Scott Drew's twelfth season at Baylor. The Bears competed in the Big 12 Conference and played their home games at the Ferrell Center. They finished the season 24–10, 11–7 in Big 12 play to finish in a tie for fourth place. They advanced to the semifinals of the Big 12 tournament where they lost to Kansas. They received an at-large bid to the NCAA tournament where they were upset in the second round by Georgia State.

Pre-season

Departures

Recruits

Roster

Schedule and results

|-
! colspan=9 style="background:#004834; color:#FDBB2F;" |Regular season

|-
! colspan=9 style="background:#004834; color:#FDBB2F;" | Big 12 tournament

|-
! colspan=9 style="background:#004834; color:#FDBB2F;" | NCAA tournament

Rankings

References

Baylor
Baylor Bears men's basketball seasons
Baylor